Torestorp/Älekulla FF is a Swedish football club located in Torestorp.

Background
Torestorps IF and Älekulla IF merged in 2008 to form Torestorp/Älekulla FF. The new club took the place of Torestorps IF in Division 5 Västergötland Sydvästra.

Torestorp/Älekulla FF currently plays in Division 4 Västergötland Södra which is the sixth tier of Swedish football. They play their home matches at the Svansjövallen in Torestorp and Äbyvallen in Älekulla.

The club is affiliated to Västergötlands Fotbollförbund.

Season to season

Footnotes

External links
 FF – Official website

Football clubs in Västra Götaland County
2008 establishments in Sweden